Bruno Angoletta (7 September 1889 - 7 January 1954) was an Italian illustrator, cartoonist and painter.

Angoletta was born in Belluno, from Orlando, a lawyer, and Francesca Bettio. For some years he studied law in Padua, but later abandoned his studies to entirely focusing into drawing and painting as an autodidact. In late 1900s he started a collaboration as an illustrator with the satirical weekly magazine L'Asino, then he moved to Rome where he also began to collaborate with the magazine La tribuna illustrata.

At the outbreak of the First World War, despite his pericarditis, he volunteered,  was wounded and taken prisoner in Bohemia but even performed acts of heroism that earned him two decorations.

In 1921, he founded with Antonio Beltramelli the monthly children magazine Giro Giro Tondo, published by Mondadori.

In  January 1928, in the pages of Corriere dei Piccoli, Angoletta started his most successful comic character, the soldier Marmittone, a mild-mannered young soldier who often, due to its mild-tempered and not inclined to war, ends up being punished and translated into the cell. The comic strip was published until 1940.

Other well known comic characters he created in the period between the two wars were Sor Calogero Sorbara, Ermete Centarbe and Romolino & Romoletto, a couple of twins often glorifying the Fascist victories.

References

Further reading
 Franco Cavallone, Bruno Angoletta, Garzanti, 1975.
 Erik Balzaretti (cured by), "Dalla A. alla Ang. – Bruno Angoletta professione illustratore", in Collezionare fumetti & libri per l'infanzia, n. 3, January 2001, Little Nemo

Italian comics artists
1889 births
1954 deaths
People from Belluno